Ralf Pedersen (born 20 September 1973) is a Danish former professional footballer who played as a  defender and who is the assistant manager of Randers FC.

Career
On 26 August 2019, Pedersen returned to Randers FC as an assistant manager and transition coach.

References

External links
Career statistics at Danmarks Radio

1973 births
Living people
Danish men's footballers
Association football defenders
Viborg FF players
Randers FC players
Danish Superliga players
Kjellerup IF players